Freneau Woods Park is a county park near the northern border of Monmouth County, in Aberdeen Township, New Jersey.

Acquired by the Park System in 2011, the park consists of 210 acres of fields and forests along the headwaters of the Matawan Creek and the southern boundary of Lake Lefferts. The park provides important habitats and green space in a densely populated part of the county.  Part of the property was once owned by Philip Morin Freneau,"The Poet of the American Revolution", who gives his name to the park. Later, the property was owned by a monastery, whose former buildings are used for events and as a visitor's center. The park is still in active growth and will eventually encompass 250 acres of open space.

Activities and facilities

Freneau Woods is currently a passive park, offering self-guided hiking, biking and horse riding on 1.6 miles (2.58 kilometers) of trails. In addition to self-guided activities, the park system offers programs and guided hikes. It is hoped that the park may be eventually connected to the Henry Hudson Trail.

References

External links 
 Freneau Woods Park (County Park System)
 Trail Maps

Monmouth County Park System
Aberdeen Township, New Jersey